Ancistronycha is a genus of soldier beetles in the family Cantharidae. There are about eight described species in Ancistronycha, found in Europe and Northern Asia (excluding China).

Species
These eight species belong to the genus Ancistronycha:
 Ancistronycha abdominalis (Fabricius, 1798) (Blue Soldier Beetle)
 Ancistronycha antaliensis Kazantsev, 2010
 Ancistronycha astur Heyden, 1880
 Ancistronycha erichsonii Bach, 1854
 Ancistronycha lucens Moscardini, 1967
 Ancistronycha occipitalis (Rosenhauer, 1847)
 Ancistronycha taygetana Pic, 1902
 Ancistronycha tigurina Dietrich, 1857

References

External links

 

Cantharidae
Elateroidea genera